This is a list of the senators who have represented the department of Ariège. The department had two seats under the Third Republic and only one since the Fourth Republic. The current President of the Senate, Jean-Pierre Bel, is also senator of Ariège since 1998.

Historic list

Third Republic

Fourth Republic

Fifth Republic

References 

Ariege